Ajazdin Nuhi (Serbian Cyrillic: Ајаздин Нухи; born 10 October 1979) is a Serbian former professional footballer of Gorani descent.

Club career
Nuhi started his senior career at Čukarički in 1997. He was transferred to Partizan in the summer of 2001, winning the national championship title in his first season at the club. Later on, Nuhi also played on loan for Legia Warsaw (2003) and Sartid Smederevo (2004).

Between 2004 and 2006, Nuhi represented Montenegrin side Zeta, while the club still competed in the First League of Serbia and Montenegro. He then spent three seasons with OFK Beograd in the Serbian SuperLiga. Between 2009 and 2011, Nuhi played for another Montenegrin club Mogren, this time in the Montenegrin First League.

International career
In 2001, Nuhi was capped once for FR Yugoslavia at under-21 level.

Honours
Partizan
 First League of FR Yugoslavia: 2001–02
Mogren
 Montenegrin First League: 2010–11

References

External links
 
 

Association football midfielders
Ekstraklasa players
Expatriate footballers in Montenegro
Expatriate footballers in Poland
First League of Serbia and Montenegro players
FK BSK Borča players
FK Čukarički players
FK Kolubara players
FK Mogren players
FK Napredak Kruševac players
FK Partizan players
FK Smederevo players
FK Zeta players
Gorani people
Kosovo Serbs
Legia Warsaw players
Montenegrin First League players
OFK Beograd players
People from Dragaš
Serbia and Montenegro footballers
Serbia and Montenegro under-21 international footballers
Serbian expatriate footballers
Serbian expatriate sportspeople in Montenegro
Serbian expatriate sportspeople in Poland
Serbian First League players
Serbian footballers
Serbian SuperLiga players
1979 births
Living people